Kalateh-ye Khalilabad (also Romanized as Kalāteh-ye Khalīlābād; also known as Kalāteh-ye Khalīlzādeh and Khalīlābād) is a village in Zangelanlu Rural District, Lotfabad District, Dargaz County, Razavi Khorasan Province, Iran. At the 2006 census, its population was 134, in 28 families.

References 

Populated places in Dargaz County